SrbA (sRNA regulator of biofilms A) is a small regulatory non-coding RNA identified in pathogenic Pseudomonas aeruginosa. It is important for biofilm formation and pathogenicity. Bacterial strain with deleted SrbA had reduced biofilm mass. As the  ability to form biofilms  can contribute to the ability a pathogen to thrive  within  the host, the C. elegans  hosts infected with the srbA deleted strain displayed significantly lower mortality rate than the wild-type strain. However, the deletion of srbA had no effect on growth or antibiotic resistance in P. aeruginosa.

See also 
 NrsZ small RNA
 Pseudomonas sRNA
 AsponA antisense RNA

References 

Non-coding RNA